Questlove Supreme is a weekly podcast hosted by The Roots drummer Questlove. Episodes are released on Wednesdays on iHeartMedia.

A combination of interviews, humor, pop culture and music, the program features guests such as Maya Rudolph, Solange, John Oliver, Shep Gordon, Q-Tip, and The Revolution. Consequence of Sound summed the show up as a "music junkie's dream," specifically for its "handpicked mixtape of Questlove-approved jams."

History 
The show began as an extension of the music courses Questlove taught at New York University and is what he calls "black nerd version of NPR." To prepare for each episode, Questlove personally listens to around 200 songs. He describes the partnership with Pandora as, "...a commitment deeper than any girlfriend I've ever had, or any diet I've tried to stick to."

The second season of the podcast launched on April 26, 2017 with a three-part episode featuring Babyface. New features were also introduced, including a condensed format, chapter segments that allow listeners to revisit and pause the episode and the ability to listen to past episodes. The station also features a constantly updated mix of songs referenced on the show.

In 2019 the podcast moved from Pandora to iHeartMedia.

See also 

 Music podcast

References

Music podcasts
Audio podcasts
2016 podcast debuts
American podcasts